Hillevåg Station was a railway station located in the city of Stavanger in the municipality of  Stavanger in Rogaland county, Norway. It was closed in 2009, and replaced by Paradis Station. The station was served by the Jæren Commuter Rail between Stavanger and Egersund.

Railway stations in Stavanger
Railway stations on the Sørlandet Line
Railway stations opened in 1880
1880 establishments in Norway
2009 disestablishments in Norway